Minoru "Frank" Hatashita (17 September 1919 – 24 August 1996) was the first Canadian judoka to achieve the rank of hachidan (8th dan) and was deeply involved in the development and promotion of Judo in Canada. He was the President of the Canadian Kodokan Black Belt Association (now Judo Canada) for 18 years, President of the Pan-American Judo Union, Vice-President of the International Judo Federation, and Doug Rogers' coach at the 1964 Summer Olympics, where Rogers won silver. Hatashita was inducted into the Canadian Olympic Hall of Fame in 1975 and the Judo Canada Hall of Fame in 1996.

See also 
 Judo in Ontario
Judo in Canada
 List of Canadian judoka

References

Further reading 
 
 
 

Canadian male judoka
1919 births
1996 deaths
Sportspeople from Vancouver
20th-century Canadian people